Sarosa ozora is a moth of the subfamily Arctiinae. It was described by Herbert Druce in 1883. It is found in Colombia.

References

Arctiinae
Moths described in 1883